Alemannia 22 Berlin was a short-lived German association football club from the city of Berlin. The club was also known as Neuköllner FC Alemannia after the Neukölln district of the city where it was based.

Alemannia was a workers' side that was part of the Arbeiter-Turn- und Sportbund (ATSB Worker's Gymnastics and Sports Federation), a leftist national organization that was active from 1893–1933 until banned under the Nazi regime as politically undesirable. The ATSB staged a football competition and championship separate from that of the DFB (Deutscher Fußball Bund, en:German Football Association) from 1920–33.

In 1923, the club beat FT Stettin-Bredow (4-0), Tasmania Forst (3–1) and Komet Altona (3–1) on their way to the ATSB national final against defending two-time champion VfL Leipzig-Südost. The first meeting between the two clubs ended in a 1–0 victory for Leipzig that was annulled following a protest by the Berliners over the date and grounds for the mach. Alemania lost the rematch 3–1.

In the 1923/24 season, Alemannia 22 was able to defend the championship title of the Märkische Spielvereinigung, defeating FT Neukölln-Britz 3–1 in the final at the Lichtenberg stadium on 6 April 1924. In the first round of the East German championship the 1st Stettiner RSV Walhalla was eliminated 2:1 in Stettin on 11 May 1924, but in the second round Alemannia 22 was eliminated on 18 May 1924 in Guben against SV Stern Breslau with 0:1. In the 1925/26 season, Alemannia 22 became champion of the Märkische Spielvereinigung again, but did not participate in the East German championship due to excessive travel costs.

In the following years the club could not achieve further successes. In 1928 Alemannia 22 split off with the other clubs of the Märkische Spielvereinigung from the social democrat dominated ATSB. From 1930 to February 1933, the Märkische Spielvereinigung belonged to the KPD-related Kampfgemeinschaft für Rote Sporteinheit ("Red Sport Unity"). In March 1933, BFC Alemannia 22 was forced to dissolve by the new National Socialist regime. There was no successor association after the Second World War.

Results

Regional and National Championships 

* Following a protest regarding the original date and choice of site (Halle) for the final, a rematch was held in Berlin.

* Game is listed as being interrupted and replayed.

End of League Championships

Leagues

References 

Football clubs in Germany
Defunct football clubs in Germany
Allemannia
German workers' football clubs
Association football clubs established in 1922
1922 establishments in Germany
1920s disestablishments in Germany